Clearfield Township, Pennsylvania is the name of two places in the U.S. state of Pennsylvania:
Clearfield Township, Butler County, Pennsylvania
Clearfield Township, Cambria County, Pennsylvania

Pennsylvania township disambiguation pages